The Ramsey Show (formerly known as The Dave Ramsey Show) is a three-hour self-syndicated radio program and podcast, hosted by the eponymous finance author and speaker Dave Ramsey, that airs Monday through Friday from 2-5 PM ET. It is broadcast from Franklin, Tennessee.

Ramsey takes live calls on the theme of finance, and occasionally money-related Christian philosophy as it pertains to tithing, etc.  During the show, he discusses life and money-related issues with callers. He is known for his complete disdain of debt collectors, calling them (among other things) "scum" and dishonest, and urging his listeners not to deal with them unless necessary, and then to get everything in writing, especially involving offers to reduce debts. One notable difference between his and other financial shows is that Ramsey attempts to go beyond mathematical mechanics and reach his callers on an emotional and spiritual level.

The Ramsey Show has a channel on iHeartRadio and Sirius XM. , it is one of the top five most-listened-to radio shows.

History 
The program began June 15, 1992, when Ramsey, selling copies of Financial Peace out of the trunk of his car, was a guest on 99.7 WWTN.  The station had recently filed Chapter 11 bankruptcy and one of its hosts had quit after not getting paid, which left the station scrambling to fill the gap in its lineup. Ramsey offered to do a one-hour show for free for one month, not entirely expecting to be successful. The Money Game went on the air with Ramsey, Hal Wilson and Roy Matlock each hosting the hour alone on certain days of the week. Ramsey was the bankruptcy and "get out of debt" guru on Mondays and Wednesdays, Matlock answered investing questions Tuesdays and Thursdays, and Wilson's Friday topic was primarily real estate. After station management asked Wilson to discontinue his portion of the program, Ramsey and Matlock teamed up to host the show five days per week. Eventually, Matlock left the show on good terms to focus on his financial services business, leaving Ramsey to host the show alone.

The program became quite popular in Nashville. Reportedly, when WWTN asked Ramsey who would be syndicating his show, Ramsey simply pointed to Blake Thompson, who continues as executive producer of the show to this day. As Bill Hampton, Vice President of The Lampo Group stated, "they learned syndication from the ground up."

The Money Game changed its name to The Dave Ramsey Show in mid-1996. In 2006, the show received two nominations for the 2006 Radio & Records News/Talk Industry Achievement Awards. It is the fifth year in a row for Dave Ramsey in the "Syndicated Personality of the Year" category, and the second year in a row for Bill Hampton in the "Executive of the Year" category.

On the success of the show, Bill Hampton stated that it did $2.5 million in network sales in 2005 while MyTMMO.com did $1.2 million. He also stated the show would bring in an estimated $3.7 million from advertisers.  The show is now also available on podcast via iTunes.

Ramsey's show is one of very few national radio shows to be self-syndicated. The program is not connected to any national network or programming service, and is distributed directly to local stations. Ramsey's show is fed to stations 24/7 so that stations will not have to record his show for later broadcast, but rather they can always use the satellite feed. The show is distributed via Westwood One's satellite platform.

After 20 years of broadcasting on WTN, on January 1, 2013, the show moved to 102.5 FM ("The Game"). Ramsey and WTN were unable to come to terms over a renewal contract. One year later, on January 1, 2014, the show moved to WLAC.

, the show is heard on more than 600 stations.

"Seven Baby Steps" Formula 
With a simple, seven-stage "baby steps" formula (Baby Step Two is based on the debt-snowball method), Ramsey urges listeners to avoid all debt except for certain types of home mortgages.

Ramsey's Seven Baby Steps are:

1. Save $1,000 for a starter emergency fund.

2. Pay off all debt (except the house) using the debt snowball.

3. Save 3-6 months expenses in a fully funded emergency fund.

4. Invest 15% of household income in retirement.

5. Save for children's college fund.

6. Pay off home early.

7. Build wealth and give.

References

External links 
 

American talk radio programs
iHeartMedia radio stations
Mass media in Nashville, Tennessee
Sirius XM Radio channels
Sirius XM Radio programs